KWAC may refer to:

 Key Word Alongside Context, a modification of the KWIC concordance line format.
 KWAC (AM), a radio station (1490 AM) licensed to Bakersfield, California